Enrico Lopez-Yañez is the principal pops conductor of the Nashville Symphony.

Biography 
Enrico Lopez-Yañez is currently the Principal Pops Conductor of the Nashville Symphony after serving as the assistant conductor since 2017. Lopez-Yañez has led performances with artists such as Nas, Toby Keith, Trisha Yearwood, The Beach Boys, Kenny Loggins, Renée Elise Goldsberry, and the Marcus Roberts Trio. Lopez-Yañez moved to Nashville following two seasons as Assistant Conductor with the Omaha Symphony. In the summer of 2016, Lopez-Yañez served as Assistant Conductor to Christoph Eschenbach and Valery Gergiev for the National Youth Orchestra of the United States's Carnegie Hall, New York state, and European tour performances.

Lopez-Yañez has made appearances with orchestras throughout North America, including the Detroit Symphony, San Diego Symphony, Utah Symphony, Florida Orchestra,  Sarasota Orchestra, and Oklahoma City Philharmonic among others. Additionally, Lopez-Yañez maintains an active role as an operatic conductor having served as Assistant Conductor and Chorus Master for the Berkshire Opera Festival. He has led opera gala concerts in San Diego and Aguascalientes (Mexico), productions of Daniel Catán's Rappaccini's Daughter (opera) with Chicago Opera Theater and Giacomo Puccini's Madama Butterfly with Main Street Opera in Chicago, and served as Assistant Conductor for Opera Omaha's production of La Boheme.

A major advocate for music education, Lopez-Yañez also designs Symphonic Education Shows distributed by Symphonica Productions, which have been premiered by orchestras such as the Rochester Philharmonic, Sarasota Orchestra, Omaha Symphony and the Nashville Symphony. He also reaches young audiences through his active role as both a composer (with works like Kokowanda Bay which was premiered by the Omaha Symphony on their subscription Family Series) and as a recording artist/producer/arranger with albums like Ruth and Emilia's The Spaceship that Fell in My Backyard and Kokowanda Bay which have won Parents' Choice Awards, Global Music in Media Awards, and the John Lennon Songwriting Contest.

Discography

Education 
Lopez-Yañez's principal teachers were Jim Ross and Thomas Wilkins, with additional studies and masterclasses from Lorin Maazel, and Michael Tilson Thomas. He holds a Masters in Music in Orchestral Conducting from the University of Maryland. Before studying at Maryland, Lopez-Yañez received his Baccalaureate and Masters in Music from UCLA.

References

External links 
 Enrico Lopez-Yañez's website for bio and events
 

Living people
American male conductors (music)
Mexican conductors (music)
Male conductors (music)
ASCAP composers and authors
21st-century American conductors (music)
21st-century American male musicians
20th-century American composers
21st-century American composers
Mexican classical composers
American music arrangers
20th-century American male musicians
University of California, Los Angeles alumni
University of Maryland, College Park alumni
Year of birth missing (living people)